Xyleborus is a genus of lichen-forming fungi in the family Stereocaulaceae. It has two species. The genus was circumscribed in 2009 by Richard C. Harris and Douglas Ladd with Xyleborus sporodochifer assigned as the type species. A second species, X. sporodochifer, was added to the genus in 2015.

References

Stereocaulaceae
Lecanorales genera
Lichen genera
Taxa described in 2007